Santaquin is a city in Utah and Juab counties in the U.S. state of Utah. It is part of the Provo–Orem metropolitan area. The population was 13,725 at the 2020 census.

Geography
Santaquin lies southeast of Utah Lake in southern Utah County, with a small portion extending south into Juab County. It is bordered to the northwest by Genola and to the north by unincorporated Spring Lake. Interstate 15 passes through the city, with access from Exits 242 and 244. I-15 leads north  to Provo and south  to Nephi. U.S. Route 6 passes through Santaquin as Main Street and leads west  to Silver City. Utah State Route 198 leads north from I-15  to Payson.

Climate
This climatic region is typified by large seasonal temperature differences, with hot summers and cold (sometimes severely cold) winters. According to the Köppen Climate Classification system, Santaquin has a humid continental climate, abbreviated "Dfa" on climate maps.

History

Santaquin, one of the early settlements along the Salt Lake Road, was originally settled in late 1851. It was originally named Summit City because of its location near the summit of the divide between Utah Valley and Juab Valley. Summit City was settled by pioneers who were helping settle nearby Payson to the north. In 1856 it was renamed "Santaquin" for the son of Guffich, a local native chieftain friendly to the settlers. Santaquin incorporated as a town in the 1890s and changed to a city effective January 4, 1932.

Demographics

As of the census of 2000, there were 4,834 people, 1,304 households, and 1,155 families residing in the city. The population density was 1,848.8 people per square mile (715.1/km2). There were 1,364 housing units at an average density of 521.7 per square mile (201.8/km2). The racial makeup of the city was 91.54% White, 0.17% African American, 0.62% Native American, 0.17% Asian, 0.06% Pacific Islander, 6.08% from other races, and 1.37% from two or more races. Hispanic or Latino of any race were 8.56% of the population.

There were 1,304 households, out of which 61.1% had children under the age of 18 living with them, 77.8% were married couples living together, 7.5% had a female householder with no husband present, and 11.4% were non-families. 9.3% of all households were made up of individuals, and 4.0% had someone living alone who was 65 years of age or older. The average household size was 3.71 and the average family size was 3.97.

In the city, the population was spread out, with 42.3% under the age of 18, 11.3% from 18 to 24, 29.1% from 25 to 44, 12.4% from 45 to 64, and 4.9% who were 65 years of age or older. The median age was 23 years. For every 100 females, there were 105.3 males. For every 100 females age 18 and over, there were 99.6 males.

The median income for a household in the city was $44,531, and the median income for a family was $45,323. Males had a median income of $35,076 versus $20,581 for females. The per capita income for the city was $13,725. About 1.9% of families and 2.2% of the population were below the poverty line, including 1.6% of those under age 18 and 6.1% of those age 65 or over.

Main Street has a few stores and restaurants but no big-box stores.

Notable person
 Gary Coleman (1968–2010), actor

Orchard Days 
Orchard Days is a week-long celebration in late July and early August with a multitude of activities including a parade, rodeo, carnival, scavenger hunt, and several other family-friendly activities.

See also

 List of cities and towns in Utah

References

External links

 

Cities in Juab County, Utah
Cities in Utah County, Utah
Cities in Utah
Provo–Orem metropolitan area
Populated places established in 1851
1851 establishments in Utah Territory